Youssef Fakhr Eddine (15 January 1935 – 27 December 2002) was an Egyptian actor and the brother of actress Mariam Fakhr Eddine.

His wife Nadia was killed in a car accident in 1974 which caused him a case of severe depression, and as a result he left acting and moved to live in Greece until the end of his life.

Filmography 

He appeared in 16 films from 1957 to 1980 including successful supporting roles such as the 1967 film titled "Beach of fun" (in Arabic "Chatei el marah") which starred Najat Al Saghira;

Daerat al shak (1980)
... aka Circle of Doubt
Harami el hob (1977)
... aka The Thief of Love
Al-khatafin (1972)
... aka Kidnappers 
Hekayet thalass banat (1968) .... 
Engineer
 Losos Lakn Zorafaa (1968)... aka Thieves but Funny
Beit el talibat (1967) .... Youssef
Chatei el marah (1967) .... Assistant
Endama nouheb (1967) .... Medhat
Thalath Losoos (1966) …. New resident
... aka Three Thieves
El resala el akhira (1965)
... aka The Last Message
Awal hub (1964)
... aka First Love
Bayaat el jarayed (1964)
... aka The Newspaper Seller
Hub wa marah wa chabab (1964) .... Youssef
... aka Love, Pleasure, and Youth
Seraa el gababera (1963)
... aka Struggle of Giants
Al Hubb Keda (1961)
... aka That’s What Love Is
Amalekat el behar (1961)
... aka Giants of the Sea
Rehla gharamia (1957)
... aka Lover's Walk

References

External links

20th-century Egyptian male actors
Egyptian male film actors
Egyptian people of Hungarian descent
1935 births
2002 deaths